Keratin, type I cytoskeletal 17 is a protein that in humans is encoded by the KRT17 gene.

Keratin 17 is a type I cytokeratin. It is found in nail beds, hair follicles, sebaceous glands, and other epidermal appendages. Mutations in the gene encoding this protein lead to PC-K17 (previously known as Jackson-Lawler) type pachyonychia congenita and steatocystoma multiplex.

Interactions 

Keratin 17 has been shown to interact with CCDC85B.

References

Further reading

External links 
  GeneReviews/NCBI/NIH/UW entry on Pachyonychia Congenita

Keratins